Luziola (watergrass) is a genus of New World in the grass family, native to North and South America including the West Indies.

 Species
 Luziola bahiensis (Steud.) Hitchc. - South America (Colombia to Argentina), Greater Antilles, Central America, USA (FL AL MS)
 Luziola brasiliana Moric. - Venezuela (Portuguesa, Apure, Bolívar, Barinas, Guárico), Brazil (Piauí, Bahia)
 Luziola brasiliensis (Trin.) Swallen  - Venezuela (Guárico), Brazil (Piauí, Rio de Janeiro, São Paulo, Santa Catarina, Rio Grande do Norte)
 Luziola caespitosa Swallen - Brazil (Bahia)
 Luziola divergens Swallen - Minas Gerais
 Luziola fluitans (Michx.) Terrell & H.Rob. - Mexico, Guatemala, USA (TX LA AR MS AL GA FL NC  SC)
 Luziola fragilis Swallen - Costa Rica, Venezuela (Guárico), Bolivia (Beni), Brazil (Mato Grosso, Minas Gerais, Paraná)
 Luziola gracillima Prodoehl - Mexico, Paraguay, Argentina
 Luziola peruviana J.F.Gmel. - Cuba; Latin America from Mexico to Uruguay; naturalized in United States (TX LA FL)
 Luziola spruceana Benth. ex Döll - Honduras, Trinidad, Brazil, Paraguay
 Luziola subintegra Swallen - from Mexico + Greater Antilles to Paraguay; naturalized in Florida

References

Poaceae genera
Oryzoideae